Ioan Moța (Nojag, Hunedoara County, 15 December 1868 - Bucharest, 20 November 1940) was a Romanian priest and journalist, as well as father to prominent Iron Guard personality Ion Moța. Moța is buried at Orăștie.

In March 1917, Moța was a member of a group of exiled Romanian Habsburg subjects who were sent as a delegation to the United States to champion Romania's cause.

Journalistic works 
 "Foaia Poporului", Sibiu (1893-1895), 
 "Revista Orăștiei" (1895- 1898), 
 "Telegraful Român" (1898-1899) 
 "Bunul Econom", Orăștie (1899 - 1901)
 "Libertatea" (1902-1915, 1919-1933), Orăștie 
 "Libertatea" (1917), Cleveland, Ohio 
 "Foaia Interesantă" (1917), Cleveland, Ohio

See also 
 Ion Moța, his son

References
 Vasile Stoica, "In America pentru cauza romaneasca", Tip. Universul, București 1926. 
 Florin Mirghesiu - "Iași - Washington via Siberia, Coreea, Japonia și Hawaii", in Magazin Istoric, no. 12, December 2004.
 Lucian Boia, "On the history of rumanian immigration to America," in Romanian Studies, 1973-1975.

External links 
 Predica la duminica 26 dupa Rusalii - Pilda bogatului caruia i-a rodit tarina

1868 births
1940 deaths
People from Hunedoara County
People from the Kingdom of Hungary
Romanian Austro-Hungarians
Romanian Orthodox priests
Romanian biographers
Romanian male writers
Male biographers
Romanian textbook writers
Romanian journalists
Romanian memoirists
19th-century Eastern Orthodox priests
20th-century Eastern Orthodox priests